The Gazette is  a newspaper based in Galax, Virginia. The newspaper is owned by Landmark Community Newspapers.

References

Galax, Virginia
Newspapers published in Virginia